Martell (formerly Oneida)  is a census-designated place in Amador County, California, United States. The population was 282 at the 2010 census.

Martell is located west of Jackson and east of Ione, by which it is connected by the Amador Central Railroad. Martell is where several major retail outlets for Amador County are located, including Wal-Mart, Safeway and Lowe's. McDonald's, Burger King, Starbucks, Baskin-Robbins, Jack in the Box and Subway are restaurant chains in town. The community is in ZIP code 95654 and area code 209.

Demographics
The 2010 United States Census reported that Martell had a population of 282. The racial makeup of Martell was 234 (83.0%) White, 0 (0.0%) African American, 14 (5.0%) Native American, 0 (0.0%) Asian, 5 (1.8%) Pacific Islander, 14 (5.0%) from other races, and 15 (5.3%) from two or more races. Hispanic or Latino of any race were 36 persons (12.8%).

The Census reported that 217 people (77.0% of the population) lived in households, 65 (23.0%) lived in non-institutionalized group quarters, and 0 (0%) were institutionalized.

There were 97 households, out of which 23 (23.7%) had children under the age of 18 living in them, 32 (33.0%) were opposite-sex married couples living together, 17 (17.5%) had a female householder with no husband present, 7 (7.2%) had a male householder with no wife present.  There were 7 (7.2%) unmarried opposite-sex partnerships, and 0 (0%) same-sex married couples or partnerships. 32 households (33.0%) were made up of individuals, and 6 (6.2%) had someone living alone who was 65 years of age or older. The average household size was 2.24.  There were 56 families (57.7% of all households); the average family size was 2.80.

The population was spread out, with 43 people (15.2%) under the age of 18, 43 people (15.2%) aged 18 to 24, 77 people (27.3%) aged 25 to 44, 93 people (33.0%) aged 45 to 64, and 26 people (9.2%) who were 65 years of age or older.  The median age was 41.7 years. For every 100 females, there were 89.3 males.  For every 100 females age 18 and over, there were 91.2 males.

The homeowner vacancy rate was 0%; the rental vacancy rate was 16.7%.  124 people (44.0% of the population) lived in owner-occupied housing units and 93 people (33.0%) lived in rental housing units.

Politics

References

Census-designated places in Amador County, California
Census-designated places in California